Maungakawa is located in the Waipa District, in the present day Te Miro settlement, northeast of the town of Cambridge, New Zealand. It was once the meeting place of the Kauhanganui, the parliament of the Kīngitanga and Waikato Tainui government. During the 1860s it had a population of several hundred. King Tawhiao opened a parliament building in 1891.
In 1868  was bought, or leased from Māori owners by Daniel Thornton, and, after his death, a large house was put on what was later called Sanatorium Hill.

'Te Waikato Sanatorium' for tuberculosis was officially opened in 1903 by Liberal Prime Minister, Sir Joseph Ward, as one of the few the Public Health Department hospitals . Closure came in 1921, during the second Massey Ministry, when Health Minister James Parr said half the beds were empty. He was supported by Cambridge Borough Council; the Mayor saying it was a burden on the state.

The reserve has a native bush walk and views over the surrounding area. It was formed in 1953. The Gudex stone obelisk was erected on Pukemako hill, when 7 acres were set aside from the reserve to become Gudex Memorial Park in 1968. On a clear day Mt Ruapehu and Mt Taranaki are visible.

References 

Waipa District